Anime Mid-Atlantic was an anime convention held in June (normally on Father's Day weekend) at the Norfolk Waterside Marriott in Norfolk, Virginia. The convention was previously held in Richmond, Virginia and Chesapeake, Virginia for several years.

Programming
The convention typically offered an anime music-video contest, artist's alley, dance, dealer's room, hall costume contest, karaoke, masquerade, panels, video game tournaments, video rooms, and workshops.

History
In 2001, Anime Mid-Atlantic became Richmond, Virginia's first anime convention and was held at the Holiday Inn Select Koger South Conference Center. The 2008 convention was scheduled to be held at the Hyatt Regency Crystal City in Washington, D.C., but due to a double-booking issue, the Hyatt canceled the conventions contract. The convention moved to the Holiday Inn Executive Center in Virginia Beach, Virginia. In 2010, the convention collected donations for the Make-A-Wish Foundation and held an event in remembrance of Carl Macek, who attended the convention in 2002 and was scheduled to attend the convention again before dying. The 2016 convention took place in the Chesapeake Conference Center, along with the Marriott Chesapeake and Wingate By Wyndham hotel. Due to the CEO's health issues, Anime Mid-Atlantic went on hiatus for 2019.

Event history

AMA Cosplay Fest
AMA Cosplay Fest was a three-day anime convention held during December/January at the Marriott Chesapeake in Chesapeake, Virginia. The convention's programming includes cosplay competitions, cosplay chess, fashion shows, karaoke, masquerade cosplay, panel discussions, tabletop gaming, and workshops.

Event history

References

External links
Anime Mid-Atlantic Website

 	
Inactive anime conventions
Festivals established in 2001
2001 establishments in Virginia
Annual events in Virginia
Festivals in Virginia
Culture of Norfolk, Virginia
Tourist attractions in Norfolk, Virginia
Conventions in Virginia
June events